"Railroad Track" is a song by New Zealand-born musician, singer and producer Willy Moon released in 2012 by Jack White's label Third Man Records. 

The B-side is written by Sonny Bono in 1966 and first performed by Cher. Moon changed the lyrics to adapt his interlocutor to be a female. The music is closer to the adaptation by Nancy Sinatra.

Music video
A music video for the song was directed by the American musician Michael Carter. The video shows American celebrations and urban environment ruined by the time. There are also religious and death imageries throughout the video. There is also unsubtle Bud Light product placement.

Track list

Credits
Mixed by Mark RankinPhotography by Jo McCaughyDesign by Matthew Jacobson & Julian Baker

References

2012 songs
Third Man Records singles